The Verkhovna Rada of Ukraine (Ukrainian abbreviation ВРУ), often simply Verkhovna Rada or just Rada, is the unicameral parliament of Ukraine. The Verkhovna Rada is composed of 450 deputies, who are presided over by a chairman (speaker). The Verkhovna Rada meets in the Verkhovna Rada building in Ukraine's capital Kyiv. The deputies elected on 21 July 2019 Ukrainian parliamentary election were inaugurated on 29 August 2019.

The Verkhovna Rada developed out of the systems of the republican representative body known in the Soviet Union as Supreme Soviet (Supreme Council) that was first established on 26 June 1938 as a type of legislature of the Ukrainian SSR after the dissolution of the Congress of Soviets of the Ukrainian SSR.

The 12th convocation of the Supreme Soviet of the Ukrainian SSR (elected in 1990) issued the Declaration of Independence of Ukraine, introduced elements of a market economy and political liberalization, and officially changed the numeration of its sessions, proclaiming itself the first convocation of the "Verkhovna Rada of Ukraine". The current parliament is the ninth convocation. Because of the War in Donbas and the unilateral annexation of Crimea by Russia, elections for the constituencies situated in Donbas and Crimea were not held in the 2014 and 2019 elections; hence the current composition of the Verkhovna Rada consists of 424 deputies.

In the last elections to the Verkhovna Rada, a mixed voting system is used. 50% of seats are distributed under party lists with a 5% election threshold and 50% through first-past-the-post in single-member constituencies. The method of 50/50 mixed elections was used in 2002, 2012, 2014 and 2019 elections; however, in 2006 and 2007, the elections were held under a proportional system only. According to the election law that became valid on 1 January 2020, the next election to the Verkhovna Rada, set for 2023, again will be held under a proportional scheme.

Name
The name Rada means "council", "rede". The institution originated in the time of Kyivan Rus and then represented a council of boyars and of the higher clergy. In the 17th and 18th centuries the Dnieper Cossacks used the term to refer to the meetings where major decisions were made; the Cossacks elected new councils by popular vote.

The Ukrainian People's Republic between 17 March 1917 and 29 April 1918 had a Central Rada. The West Ukrainian People's Republic and the Ukrainian government-in-exile each had a UNRada (Ukrainian National Rada).

Verkhovna, the feminine form of the adjective  meaning supreme, derives from the Ukrainian word  meaning "top".

Another name, used less often, is the Parliament of Ukraine.

History

Before independence
 Central Rada in 1917–18
 Ukrainian National Rada in 1918 (West Ukraine)
 Labour Congress of Ukraine in 1919 (along with West Ukrainian delegates)
 Rada of the Republic in 1921 (exiled in Tarnów, Poland)

The Supreme Soviet of the Ukrainian Soviet Socialist Republic replaced the All-Ukrainian Congress of Soviets and was a type of legislative authority of Soviet Ukraine according to the 1937 Constitution of the Ukrainian SSR. The All-Ukrainian Congress of Soviets had already been renamed the Supreme Council in 1927. The Congress of Soviets was initiated by its Central Executive Committee, which it elected and held accountable. The last chairman of the committee was Hryhoriy Petrovsky (also known as Grigoriy Petrovskiy in Russian transliteration).

The first elections to the Supreme Council of the Ukrainian SSR took place on 26 June 1938. The first session of the parliament took place in Kyiv from 25 July through to 28 July 1938. The first Chairman of the council was Mykhailo Burmystenko who later died during World War II. In 1938, a Presidium was elected by the council that was chaired by Leonid Korniyets. The Presidium represented the council whenever it was not in session.

During the war, the Presidium was evacuated to the city of Saratov in the Russian SFSR. On 29 June 1943, the Presidium issued an order postponing elections for the new convocation for one year while extending the first convocation. On 8 January 1944, the Council of Ministers of the Ukrainian SSR in agreement with the Communist Party decided to relocate the Presidium of the Supreme Council from Kharkiv to Kyiv. New elections were scheduled for 9 February 1947 for the Council.

Post-Soviet period
Until 24 August 1991, Verkhovna Rada kept the name Supreme Soviet of the Ukrainian SSR.

The first partially free elections to the Verkhovna Rada and local councils of people's deputies were held on 4 March 1990. Although the Communist Party still remained in control, a "Democratic Bloc" was formed by numerous parties, including People's Movement of Ukraine (Rukh), Helsinki Watch Committee of Ukraine, Party of Greens of Ukraine, and many others.

The twelfth convocation of the Supreme Council of the Ukrainian SSR issued the Declaration of State Sovereignty of Ukraine on 16 July 1990, and declared Ukrainian independence on 24 August 1991, at approximately 6 p.m. local time. At the time, the Chairman of the Verkhovna Rada was Leonid Kravchuk. The Act of Ukrainian Independence was overwhelmingly supported in a national referendum held on 1 December 1991. On 12 September 1991, the parliament adopted the law "On the Legal Succession of Ukraine". Thus, the VR became the Supreme Council of Ukraine.

The Constitution of Ukraine was adopted by the thirteenth convocation of the Verkhovna Rada on 28 June 1996, at approximately 9 a.m. local time. The parliament's fourteenth convocation officially changed the numbering of the convocations proclaiming itself the third (democratic and independent) convocation of the Verkhovna Rada. After the Orange Revolution, constitutional amendments were adopted in December 2004, by the fourth (fifteenth) convocation of the Verkhovna Rada. On 1 October 2010, the Constitutional Court of Ukraine overturned the 2004 Amendments, considering them unconstitutional. On 21 February 2014, parliament reinstated the December 2004 amendments to the constitution.

In 2017 and 2018, the website of the Verkhovna Rada was the most popular among all websites of the parliaments of UN member states.

Location

The Verkhovna Rada meets in a neo-classical building on Kyiv's vulytsia Mykhaila Hrushevskoho (Mykhaila Hrushevsky Street) and Ploshcha Konstytutsii (Constitution Square). The building adjoins Mariinskyi Park and the 18th century Mariinskyi Palace, designed by Bartolomeo Rastrelli, which serves as the official residence of the President of Ukraine.

After the transfer of the capital of the Ukrainian SSR from Kharkiv to Kyiv in 1934, a whole set of government buildings was planned for the city. In 1936, a contest for the construction of the new parliament building was won by architect Volodymyr Zabolotny.

The original building was constructed from 1936 to 1938. Having been destroyed in the Second World War, the building was reconstructed from 1945 to 1947, with the rebuilt glass dome one metre higher than the original.

Other locations
 Palace Ukraina (the 1999 presidential oath of Leonid Kuchma)
 Ukrainian House (21 January 2000)
 Building of budget committee (6–8 vulytsia Bankova on 4 April 2013)

Mission and authority

The Verkhovna Rada is the sole body of legislative power in Ukraine. The parliament determines the principles of domestic and foreign policy, introduces amendments to the Constitution of Ukraine, adopts laws, approves the state budget, designates elections for the President of Ukraine, impeaches the president, declares war and peace, appoints the Prime Minister of Ukraine, appoints or confirms certain officials, appoints one-third of the Constitutional Court of Ukraine, ratifies and denounces international treaties, and exercises certain control functions. In Ukraine there are no requirements for the minimum number of signatures (of deputies) to register a bill. In general the parliament adopts about 200 bills per year. An average of five to six bills are registered daily in parliament. As a result of this in the spring of 2019 parliament had more than 10 thousand registered and under consideration bills it had yet to debate.

All procedural regulations are contained in the Law on Regulations of the Verkhovna Rada of Ukraine. The latest version of the document was adopted on 16 December 2012, in which through the initiative of the President of Ukraine amendments were made concerning registration and voting by parliamentarians. 2012 became a year of numerous changes in regards to the document, among which were changes to the election of the chairman. Bills are usually considered following the procedure of three readings; the President of Ukraine must sign a law before it can be officially promulgated.

Until 2017 the parliament appointed and dismissed judges from their posts and permitted detention or arrest of judges (those powers were transferred to the Supreme Council of Justice).

Composition
The Verkhovna Rada is a unicameral legislature with 450 people's deputies elected on the basis of equal and direct universal suffrage through a secret ballot.

Parliamentary factions, groups, and parties

All members of parliament are grouped into parliamentary factions and groups. Members of parliament who were elected from a certain party list are not necessarily members of that party. Parties that break the 5% electoral threshold form factions in the parliament. The formation of official parliamentary factions is regulated by the Verkhovna Rada's rules and procedures.

Only 15 or more deputies may form a parliamentary faction and an MP may be a member of only one faction at a time. The chairman and his two vice-chairmen may not be the heads of factions. Under current parliamentary rules a faction of non-partisan politicians can not be smaller than the smallest faction of a political party.

Deputies who are expelled from factions or decide to leave them to become individual lawmakers; individual deputies are allowed to unite into parliamentary groups of people's deputies that again have at least 15 deputies. Several influential parties have been founded after originally being formed as a faction in the Verkhovna Rada, for example, the Party of Regions, All-Ukrainian Union "Fatherland" and Labour Ukraine.

Each parliamentary faction or group appoints a leader.

Since the Imperative mandate provisions of the Ukrainian constitution came into effect again in February 2014 a political party can withdraw a parliamentary mandate if one of their MPs leaves its parliamentary faction. MPs who defected from one faction to another were known as "Tushky" a derogatory name meaning "carcass". The term was applied to deputies allegedly bribed to switch factions.

In 2010, women accounted for 8.5% of MPs. After the 2012 parliamentary election they made up 10% of the parliament. Following the 2014 parliamentary election women made up 11.1% of the parliament; setting a record for Ukraine. For comparison, the EU average for female representation in national legislatures was 25% as of 2014. Ukraine made further progress in this area in the 2019 elections, following which 21% of the Rada was female.

On 20 March 2022, the activities of the main opposition party, Opposition Platform — For Life were suspended by the National Security and Defense Council for the period of martial law due to allegations of having ties to Russia made by the Council during the Russian invasion of Ukraine.

Biggest parliamentary factions
 1990–1994 Communist Party of Ukraine (After the failed 1991 August Putsch in Moscow it was simply called as Group of 239)
 1994–2002 Communist Party of Ukraine
 2002–2006 Viktor Yushchenko Bloc "Our Ukraine"
 2006–2014 Party of Regions
 2014 All-Ukrainian Union "Fatherland"
 2014–2019 Petro Poroshenko Bloc "Solidarity"
 2019–present Servant of the People

Members of Parliament

Members of the Verkhovna Rada are known officially as "People's deputies of Ukraine". According to the "Law on elections of national deputies of Ukraine", a citizen of Ukraine may become a People's Deputy if he or she has, on the day of the election, a) reached 21 years of age; b) political franchise; c) resided in Ukraine for the last five years.

Deputies have the right to free transportation, free use of the hall of official delegations, free housing, free medical services and free vacations at health spas. Each deputy is allowed to have up to 31 assistants-consultants four out of them are allowed to be admitted into the Secretariat of the Verkhovna Rada. Until 2019, the Ukrainian President, Prime Minister, members of the government and deputies all had parliamentary immunity and agents of law enforcement were prohibited from searching their homes or following them. During the Orange Revolution and the campaign for the 2007 parliamentary election Party of Regions, OU-PSD and BYuT all promised to strip lawmakers of their parliamentary immunity. In June 2008 the parliament failed to adopt the Bill on restriction of privileges for deputies and introduction of imperative mandate. 192 people's deputies voted "for" the bill submitted by the BYuT faction out of 436 deputies registered in the plenary hall. The factions of the opposition Party of Regions, as well as the CPU and the Lytvyn Bloc, voted against, the OU-PSD faction voted partially "for" and the BYUT faction voted unanimously "for". A proposal to send the bill for the first reading for a second time also did not find support. In May 2009 the second Tymoshenko Government approved a bill amending the Law on the status of a people's deputy of Ukraine, this bill reduced certain privileges for incumbent and former deputies. The parliament canceled some benefits and payments to lawmakers in December 2011.

Deputy's absence from parliamentary meetings is being countered by withholding salary.

In December 2019 deputy's immunity was dismantled except that a lawmaker is not legally liable for the results of voting or statements in parliament and its bodies.

Over the years several local millionaires have been members of the Rada.

In early 2020, Servant of the People announced plans to reduce the number of deputies from the current 450 to 300. An initial vote regarding this initiative garnered 236 votes in favor, 40 against, and 86 abstentions.

Oath of office
Before assuming office, the deputies must take the following oath before the leadership of the Rada and fellow deputies on the first day of a new session of the Rada.

In the original Ukrainian:

English translation:

Other offices

Chairman and deputy chairmen

The Verkhovna Rada elects from among its ranks a Chairman (Speaker), a First Deputy Chairman, and a Second Deputy Chairman.

Before the Chairman of a newly convoked Rada is elected, parliamentary sessions are presided over by members of a temporary presidium of the first session. The temporary presidium is composed of five deputies, representing the four largest parliamentary fractions plus the chairman of a preparatory deputy group of the first parliamentary session, however, the Rada may enact an ad hoc deviation from this composition rule.

The chairman presides over parliamentary sessions, signs bills and sends them to the President for promulgation, signs and promulgates parliamentary acts (other than bills), organises staff work, etc. The chairman is also empowered to call special sessions of parliament, enact bills vetoed by the President when the Verkhovna Rada votes to overturn a veto by a two-thirds majority, and participate in meetings of the National Security and Defence Council.

In circumstances where the post of President of Ukraine becomes vacant, the Chairman of the Rada becomes the acting head of state with limited authority. The chairman in duties of the President may dissolve parliament, appoint or submit for parliamentary approval candidates for key official posts, grant military ranks or state orders, and exercise the right of pardon. The Constitution and Ukrainian legislation contain no provision for presidential succession in cases where the posts of President and Chairman of the Rada are vacant simultaneously.

Presidium

The Presidium of the Verkhovna Rada is a collective name that was adapted for the chairman and his or her deputies out of tradition. Before the collapse of the Soviet Union, it was an official office that was elected at the first session of each convocation of the Supreme Soviet. Originally it consisted of a chairman, the chairman's two deputies, a secretary, and 19 additional members. Later compositions of the Presidium changed. The Presidium was regulated by Section 106 of the 1978 Constitution of the Ukrainian SSR, which empowered the Presidium with almost all of the Verkhovna Rada's powers wherever the latter was not in session, on the nominal condition that any decrees be laid at the next parliamentary session for approval. Since the adoption of the Ukrainian Constitution the institution has been discontinued, but the term is used for the leadership of parliament that includes the current chairman and his or her deputies and may include faction leaders.

The first session of every newly elected parliament is headed by a temporary presidium that consists of six members of parliament according to Article 18 of the Regulations of the Verkhovna Rada.

Ceremonial opening and the first session of new convocation
One of the most important sessions of the parliament is the first session of each newly elected parliament. The preparation for the session is conducted by the Preparation deputy group with support from the Office of the Verkhovna Rada. The formation of the group out of the newly elected People's Deputies is conducted by the Chairman of the previous convocation or his/her deputy chairpersons (Article 13, Regulations of the Verkhovna Rada). The group elects its own chairperson, his or her deputy and a secretary on principles for establishing the temporary special commission. The group terminates its activity with the establishment of parliamentary committees.

Before the opening of the first session of each newly elected parliament, all newly elected People's Deputies of Ukraine are gathered for a special ceremonial meeting to take the oath of office (article 14, Regulations of the Verkhovna Rada). An Invitation to take the oath is given by the Chairperson of the previous convocation who grants the leading word to the oldest member of the parliament and asks the members to rise and reads the oath out loud. Every member of parliament signs a copy of the oath that is held in the archives of the Verkhovna Rada.

The plenary meetings of the first session reviews the following matters: formation of the provisional presidium of the first session, establishment and registration of the factions, the situation concerning legislation pending before parliament with the Chairman of the previous convocation, the election of the Counting Commission, the chairman, the chairman's deputies, hearing of extraordinary messages on domestic and foreign affairs by the President of Ukraine, hearing and discussion of the Preparation deputy group report, about the parliamentary committees, about Conciliation board of deputy factions in the Verkhovna Rada and about media coverage of the activities and sessions held by the Verkhovna Rada.

Office of the Verkhovna Rada 

The Office of the Verkhovna Rada is an internal supporting department of the Verkhovna Rada that provides organizational, legal, social, analytical and other support to parliament, its other departments and members of the parliament. The Office is apolitical in its role and exists mainly to provide secretarial help.

Before the first session of each newly elected parliament, the Office provides to members of parliament various documents among which are copies of the Constitution of Ukraine, the Regulations of the Verkhovna Rada, the official results of the election from the Central Election Commission of Ukraine, the Law of Ukraine on the status of People's Deputies, among others (Article 12, Regulations of the Verkhovna Rada).

Office of the Ombudsman
The Office of the Ombudsman at the Verkhovna Rada was established in 1998 and was led by Nina Karpachova until 2012. The Office has its own secretariat and advisory council. The current Ombudsman is Lyudmyla Denisova who replaced Valeriya Lutkovska in 2017.

Committees

The Verkhovna Rada establishes parliamentary committees composed of various deputies. On 4 December 2014, the current parliament formed 27 committees and 2 special control commissions. The previous parliament (2012–2014) had 29 committees and an ad hoc supervisory board. The sixth session of the Rada (2007–2012) had 28 committees, including the Budget Committee, the Special Control Commission of the Verkhovna Rada on Privatization and the Committee on Transportation and Communications. There are no permanent or standing committees; instead, committees are reformed from one convocation to another. One of the most significant assignments of the Verkhovna Rada is the Budget Committee.

Investigative commissions
Members of the Verkhovna Rada are permitted to create temporary investigative commissions. Creating such a commission requires one-third of the constitutional composition of parliament, 150 members. Before a draft on creation of such a commission may be scheduled for voting, it has to be approved by a relevant committee, the Committee on Regulations, deputy ethics, and ensuring the work of the Verkhovna Rada.

Mass media
 Holos Ukrainy
 Rada TV

Incidents in parliament

Fights and incidents
Brawls are not unusual in the Ukrainian parliament. On several occasions work in parliament is blocked by sit-ins by various parties (usually for a couple of days; but in 2008 from 18 January till 6 March and in February 2013 for 17 days). In 2000 and on 4 April 2013 the parliament split into two and held two sessions on two different premises.

A noticeable incident was the disorder of 27 April 2010, after the parliament ratified a treaty that extended the Russian Black Sea Fleet lease in the Crimean port of Sevastopol until 2042, when Chairman Volodymyr Lytvyn had to be shielded with umbrellas as he was pelted with eggs, while smoke bombs exploded and politicians brawled. Another major incident occurred on 16 December 2010 when several Rada members were admitted to hospital after Party of Regions politicians stormed the parliament podium, which was occupied by the Bloc Yulia Tymoshenko faction.

On 12 December 2012, an all-out scuffle broke out in Parliament, as Batkivshchyna party members attempted to prevent the swearing in of two members who had left the party. (This was the Parliament's first session following the October 2012 election.) The same day members of the All-Ukrainian Union "Svoboda" removed the fence around the Verkhovna Rada that was installed early October 2012. The speaker of the parliament Volodymyr Rybak promised to review the incident of the fence removal. The fence is not accounted as the property of parliament nor the city of Kyiv. Rybak noted that the matter might require a review within a special designated committee.

From the parliamentary election of 28 October 2012 till the first months of 2013 parliamentary work was virtually paralyzed because the opposition (UDAR, Fatherland, Svoboda, others) blocked the podium and chairman's seat on various days.

International relations
 Inter-Parliamentary Union (Geneva)
 Parliamentary dimension of the Central European Initiative (Trieste)
 Parliamentary Assembly of the Organization for Security and Co-operation in Europe (PA OSCE, Copenhagen)
 European Parliament (Brussels)
 Euronest Parliamentary Assembly (Brussels)
 NATO Parliamentary Assembly (NATO PA, Brussels)
 Interparliamentary Assembly of member nations of the Commonwealth of Independent States (Moscow)
 Interparliamentary Assembly of the Eurasian Economic Community (Saint Petersburg)
 GUAM Parliamentary Assembly (Kyiv)
 Interparliamentary Assembly on Orthodoxy (Athens)
 Parliamentary Assembly of the Organization of the Black Sea Economic Cooperation (PA BSEC, Istanbul)

Parliamentary Assembly of the Council of Europe
Ukraine was accepted as a full member of the Parliamentary Assembly of the Council of Europe (PACE) in 1995.

It is represented there by the parliamentary delegation of the Verkhovna Rada consisting of 12 representatives including a chairperson of the delegation, a vice-chairperson and their 12 substitutes; in total, 24 members. The Ukrainian delegation also has its own permanent secretariat of four members that assist in the inter-parliamentary relationships between the PACE and the Verkhovna Rada. For the full list of members, refer to the PACE main website at assembly.coe.int.
 2002–2006 Borys Oliynyk (CPU), Anatoliy Rakhansky (LB)
 2006–2007 Serhiy Holovaty (OU), Hryhoriy Nemyria (BYuT)
 2007–2012 Ivan Popescu (PR), Olha Herasymiyuk (OU)
 2012–present Ivan Popescu (PR), Serhiy Sobolyev (Ba)

Elections

Political developments in Ukraine have led to repeated changes in the electoral system used for parliamentary elections. Each convocation of the Verkhovna Rada has been elected under a different set of laws gradually evolving from the purely majoritarian scheme inherited from the Soviet era to a purely proportional scheme, effective from 2006 until 2010. The next election to the Verkhovna Rada (set for 2023) again will be held under a proportional scheme.

In the 1990 and 1994 elections, all 450 MPs were elected in single-member districts. Ukraine was therefore divided at the time into 450 electoral districts. Each district sent one member to parliament. To win a seat, a candidate needed more than 50% of the votes. If no candidate had 50%, then the two leading candidates participated in a run-off vote.

In the 1998 and 2002 elections, 225 MPs were elected in single-member districts as earlier (with the exception that the candidate needed only a simple majority to win). The remaining 225 MPs were elected on a proportional basis. These seats were divided between the parties who passed a 4% electoral threshold.

In the 2006 and 2007 elections, all deputies were elected on a proportional basis. All seats were divided between the parties who passed a 3% electoral threshold. For the 2007 election, the threshold percentage was not changed, but some amendments to the election process were made. In the 2012, 2014 and 2019 elections a mixed voting system was again used (50% under party lists and 50% under simple-majority constituencies) with a 5% election threshold.

According to current law, the next election to the Verkhovna Rada will be in 2023. According to the latest reversion of the electoral code of Ukraine, that took effect on 1 January 2020, this election will 
be without single-member constituencies and instead deputies can only be elected on a party list in one nationwide constituency with a 5% election threshold with open regional lists of candidates for deputies.

2019 election

See also
 Central Council of Ukraine, All-Ukrainian Congress of Soviets, Central Executive Committee of Ukraine
 Rada TV, the official TV channel of the Verkhovna Rada
 Supreme Soviet of the Soviet Union
 , public institution established to facilitate administrative reform to European Union standards.

Notes

References

External links

 
 
 
 
 
 
 

1990 establishments in Ukraine
Government of Ukraine
Ukraine
Ukraine
Law of Ukraine
Ukraine